The Nokia Green Room is a TV show that aired on the Channel 4 in the United Kingdom, starting in 2008. The show, that telecast music performances, was sponsored by Nokia and their music service named "Comes with Music".

Overview
The show began airing in April 2008 and consisted of live music performances, as well as the acts being monitored backstage in 'The Green Room', via hidden cameras.

Artists who have performed on the show include:

 Alesha Dixon
 Ashlee Simpson
 Cage The Elephant
 Chris Brown
 The Courteeners
 Feeder
 The Feeling
 Gnarls Barkley
 Guillemots
 The Jonas Brothers
 Kelly Rowland
 Late of the Pier
 Mystery Jets
 Robyn
 The Saturdays
 The Script
 Shaggy

The Nokia Green Room Christmas Special aired in December 2008 and featured performances by:

 Alesha Dixon
 Lemar
 McFly
 Scouting For Girls
 Sugababes

It is filmed at Riverside Studios, London.

External links
 The Nokia Green Room homepage
 The Guardian article on The Nokia Green Room

Christmas television specials
Channel 4 original programming
2008 British television series debuts
2008 British television series endings
2000s British music television series
English-language television shows